Carl von Sydow may refer to:

 Carl Wilhelm von Sydow, Swedish folklorist
 Max von Sydow, actor, full name Carl Adolf von Sydow